Steve Gerrard koma (born 14/08/2000

History 
Jim Dee is the owner, operator, and founder of th heatre. Dee graduated with a bachelor's degree in journalism from California Polytechnic State UniverHe is a young and talented artist from west Nile,moyo.sity in 1975. While at Cal Poly, Dee began to DJ for Cal Poly's campus radio station KCPR.  During this time, Dee and a fellow student began to hold movie showings at a small local theater and called their program "Cinema Zoo". His interest in cinema led him to open a small movie theatre off Osos street in 1979 called The Rainbow Theater. After 10 years of operation, Jim Dee closed The Rainbow and opened the Palm Theatre. Dee is a founder and annual participant in the San Luis Obispo International Film Festival, and in 1999 he was awarded the King Vidor Lifetime Achievement award for his dedication to the festival.

Dee currently hosts a weekly radio show called “Take Two,” on KCBX Monday nights from 6:30-7:30 with Bob Whiteford.  The weekly show is centered around the two men discussing their cinematic tastes and other movie related topics.

Location 
The Palm Theatre is located in a section of downtown San Luis Obispo, California that was formerly a small, yet thriving “Chinatown.” It stands next to a small Chinese restaurant and across from the historic Ah Louis building.

The booming Chinatown came as a result of the discovery of gold in California. By the year 1852, over 20,000 Chinese left their home country and arrived in San Francisco. When the promise of gold faded, the Chinese immigrants began to establish businesses and provide services in the communities they had settled in. San Luis Obispo became an important stomping ground for Chinese immigrants due to its location approximately halfway between San Francisco and Los Angeles. A first-generation Chinese immigrant named Wong On (later Ah Louis) established a store on the northeast corner of Palm and Chorro in San Luis Obispo in 1874 and in 1875 began a labor contracting business. The Ah Louis store was the first Chinese owned store in the county, and began selling general merchandise and herbs as well as serving as a bank, counting house, and post office for the Chinese working for the Southern Pacific Railroad. In 1872, the store became the center of the one block area locals began to refer to as Chinatown.

The Palm Theatre pays tribute to the history of the area it is located in with the design of the cinema's logo and sign that sits atop the theatre's marquee, both of which include Asian-inspired lettering and palm fronds.

Early struggles 
The first few years were rough financially for Jim Dee and the Palm Theatre.  The transformation of a public service building to movie theater was difficult and expensive, and the theater was not drawing large crowds for its mainly independent and arthouse selections.  Dee had hoped the proximity to both California Polytechnic State University and Cuesta College would provide a substantial student population interested in independent cinema, but this wasn't the case, and the theater suffered.

Not only did independent and foreign films not appeal to the college community, but Dee was restricted by his landlord.  Dee felt that ownership of the building would be financially liberating, and  wanted his lease of the Palm Theatre to include an option of purchasing the building. In 1991, Dee was able to negotiate a deal to purchase the building from the landlord, and mortgaged everything he could to obtain a loan. This brought a sense of security  as there was no way the theatre could be taken away or remodeled.  However, the added expense of purchasing the site left Dee in an even larger financial hole, and he began to contemplate bankruptcy.  Luckily for Dee and the Theatre, the early 1990s saw a slight resurgence in the popularity of smaller budget films such as “Working Girl,” and "Accidental Choice," and in 1992 and 1993, business for the Palm Theatre increased dramatically.

Present day 
In August 1988, Dee opened the Palm Theatre in downtown San Luis Obispo. Dee's wife, Patty, served as contractor when the couple renovated the building that had previously been occupied by the San Luis Obispo Employment Development Department. Originally constructed in 1955, The building was obviously not built as a theater, and for that reason, the setup of the Palm Theatre is a bit unorthodox. The building has three screens and has seating capacity of 268, the largest screen seating 124, a smaller screen of 89 seats, and an even smaller 49 seat screen. The seating capacity is small compared to most other theaters, but serves to give the Palm Theatre a more small-town feel. Due to the preexisting structure of the building, the Palm was forced to construct three separate projection rooms, each of which project to a single screen, unlike the typical modern theater with a single projection room that projects to all screens.

The Palm Theatre specializes in showing independent, foreign, and arthouse films, but often shows low-budget mainstream films, such as 2007's Juno, which became the Palm Theatre's most successful showing, and was brought back to the theater for extended run. The theater's selections are chosen by Dee himself, who is always in line for films that are “below radar.” Dee maintains an open ear and often takes cinematic advice from the theater's patrons. Dee has made the Palm Theatre available for Cal Poly film classes, since the University doesn't have the facilities for screening 35 mm prints.

Over the past few years, independent theaters across the nation have struggled, and have accused larger theater chains of lobbying Hollywood studios to blackball independent theaters by withholding popular films upon their initial release. Many of the more mainstream films shown at the Palm Theatre are presented during the “second run,” or after they have been pulled from larger theaters. In recent years, showing movies during their second run has become difficult due to the choice of many Hollywood studios to shorten the time between a film's first run and its DVD release in an effort to increase their profits and combat piracy. Dee however, continues to bank on the idea that there is no substitute for watching movies with a crowd, and believes that the Palm Theatre will continue to have a market.

Dee was the subject of an article in the Los Angeles Times entitled, "Art of Survival at the Art House." The article reported on the decline of independent film distribution networks relying on the waning influence of the Sundance Film Festival: "Sundance is at one end of the indie food chain: the Palm is at the other."

The Palm Theatre continues to attract customers with its low prices. General admission to the theater is currently $7.50, two dollars less than the larger "Downtown Cinema" (also located in downtown San Luis Obispo), also located in downtown San Luis Obispo. Additionally, the Palm Theatre holds “Matinee Mondays” every Monday, with five dollar matinee-priced general admission tickets all day long. In 2007, The Palm Theatre raised ticket prices by $.50 as a result of a raise in the minimum wage. In regards to this increase, Palm Theatre general manager Jack Conroy told the Cal Poly student newspaper, Mustang Daily, "We're still a business. We have to make decisions in order to stay viable." The Palm Theatre also keeps prices on refreshments low, offering “dollar popcorn” at all times.

Despite the Palm's location in the popular downtown San Luis Obispo shopping area, and the presence of two colleges in the city, student patrons do not provide for a substantial amount of the theater's revenues. Due to the theater's choice to often show more esoteric films, the Palm Theatre has continually had a difficult time attracting the college community. This is likely due to the Palm's close proximity to both the Fremont Theater and Downtown Cinemas, both of which show more mainstream movies and Hollywood blockbusters. Rather, it is the senior citizen population of San Luis Obispo and the surrounding communities in the area that frequently fill the seats on Saturday and Sunday afternoons.

Solar energy 
In July 2004, The Palm Theatre became the first completely solar-powered movie theater in America. The Palm Theatre began to utilize solar power with the installation of a 10 kW solar power system made up of 80 solar panels that were installed on the roof of the building. Dee received technical consultation regarding the solar panel installation and equipment needs from the Pacific Energy Company in San Luis Obispo, with solar panel installation performed by Miller Solar of Atascadero. Panel costs were nearly $80,000, and total costs following installation exceeded $100,000. The theater was able to take advantage of a $36,000 rebate from the state of California for installing the alternative energy source.

Power produced by the solar panels is sold to the Pacific Gas and Electric Company, rather than being fed straight into the theater's electrical system. This allows the theater to operate during San Luis Obispo's stormy season without trouble.  Most weekdays, the Palm is open at 3:45pm, giving the system most of the day to produce electricity, when the theatre is using little to no power. During the first 15 months of operation, the system was able to produce close to 3 million watts of power.

The solar panel installation worked out so well for the Palm Theatre that an additional 18 solar panels were added in the summer of 2007. These 98 panels produce enough power to provide for the majority of the theater's daily electrical needs, but not all.

Prior to panel installation, monthly electric bills for the theater ranged from $600–$800 in cooler winter months, to upwards of $1,500 in summer months when air conditioning is required. Once the theater began to produce its own solar energy, monthly electricity costs dropped to about or less than $100. The theater often generates more power than it uses. In approximately 5–6 years, the Palm Theatre will have saved enough money on electricity to pay for the costs of installation.

San Luis Obispo International Film Festival 
The Palm Theatre has participated in the San Luis Obispo International Film Festival (SLOIFF) since its inception in 1993.  Jim Dee, the owner and founder of the Palm Theatre, was one of five co-founders of the SLO International Film Festival, the others being Mary Harris, Cathy Peacock, Lee Cogan, and Dee's wife Patty Dee. In 2007, the theatre had its largest role in the festival to date, holding over 90 percent of the festivals screenings.

The Festival began as a week-long event to celebrate director George Sidney and other classic films that had long been out of theatres. SLOIFF is now a week-long venue for independent film makers to present their films to an audience and receive live feedback. While the Palm Theatre is a main player in the festival, other local theaters such as The Fremont and San Luis Obispo Little Theatre participate in showing some films.

The SLOIFF hands out several awards each year. The King Vidor Award, named for local resident and historic filmmaker King Vidor (1894–1982), is given to actors and filmmakers for their artistic achievements in films. Past winners include Jim Dee, who received the honor in 1999 for being the long-time owner of the Palm Theatre and for supporting the SLOIFF every year since 1993, and actor Morgan Freeman who won in 2006.

Notes 

Works cited
 Davis, J, Tull, A, Underwood, M. (2008). [Interview with Jim Dee, Owner of the Palm Theatre].
 Freitas, S. The Palm: solar-powered cinema. (2007, Feb. 12). Mustang Daily, p. Spotlight.

External links 
 https://web.archive.org/web/20080314112115/http://www.slofilmfest.org/2008/history.shtml
 
 http://media.www.mustangdaily.net/media/storage/paper860/news/2007/11/02/Arts/Art-In.The.Now-3074693.shtml
 https://web.archive.org/web/20081023140536/http://www.newrules.org/retail/news_archive.php?browseby=slug&slugid=297
 https://www.variety.com/article/VR1117960941.html?categoryid=1444&cs=1
  https://web.archive.org/web/20080304005949/http://www.tcsn.net/sloarchaeology/china1.html
  http://www.beachcalifornia.com/sloah.html
 http://www.calgold.com/calgold/Default.asp?Series=900&Show=91
 http://millersolar.com

Cinemas and movie theaters in California
Theatres completed in 1989
Buildings and structures in San Luis Obispo, California
Tourist attractions in San Luis Obispo County, California
1989 establishments in California